Aangan may also refer to:

Aangan (novel), an Urdu novel by Khadija Mastoor
Aangan (1973 film), a Hindi film by Nasir Hussain
Aangan (1982 film), film starring Sajjad Kishwar
Aangan (2017 TV series), a Pakistani drama TV series broadcast on ARY Digital, directed by Qasim Ali Mureed 
Aangan (2018 TV series), a Pakistani TV series broadcast on Hum TV, directed by Mohammed Ehteshamuddin, based on the novel of same name by Khadija Mastoor